Maqaora is a town located  away from the city of Harar in eastern Ethiopia.

Populated places in the Harari Region